Mian Rostaq (also Romanized as Mīān Rostāq, Meyān Restāq, and Mīyān Rostāq) is a village in Zarrin Gol Rural District, in the Central District of Aliabad County, Golestan Province, Iran. At the 2006 census, its population was 162, in 39 families.

References 

Populated places in Aliabad County